Bourge is a surname. Notable people with the surname include:

  (1921–2013), French astronomer
 13674 Bourge, a main-belt asteroid
 Tony Bourge (born 1948), Welsh guitarist best known as a member of Budgie

See also
 Borge (surname)
 Bourges (disambiguation)